Alexander Spinning Lilley (December 7, 1867 – December 8, 1925) was an American football coach.  He served as the first head football coach at Ohio State University. Lilley was an unpaid volunteer coach during his time coaching at Ohio State. He was also known to ride an Indian pony to practices during his tenure. A plaque at the Ohio State football stadium memorializes him as "A Lone and Ardent Volunteer".

Official records state that Lilley coached the Ohio State team from 1890 to 1891, purportedly compiling a record of 3–5. More recent research establishes that Lilley began coaching in the fall of 1890 and did not coach the first Ohio State game (vs. Ohio Wesleyan) in May 1890.

Lilley died after a five-month illness in 1925. At the time of his death he was a manager for a shipbuilding company in New York.

Head coaching record

References

External links
 

1867 births
1925 deaths
19th-century players of American football
Ohio State Buckeyes football coaches
Ohio Wesleyan Battling Bishops football coaches
Princeton Tigers football players
Lawrenceville School alumni
Players of American football from Columbus, Ohio